Bocchi is a surname, and may refer to:

 Achille Bocchi, Italian humanist writer
 Alessandro Magnoli Bocchi
 Adolfo Bocchi (b. 1892), Italian bobsledder
 Amedeo Bocchi (1883–1976), Italian painter
 Arrigo Bocchi (b.c.1871), British-Italian film director and producer
 Carlo Bocchi, conducted first survey of ancient Adria
 Dorotea Bocchi (1360–1436), Italian physician also known as Dorotea Bucca
 Faustino Bocchi, Italian painter
 Francesco Bocchi (1548–1613/1618), Italian writer
 Gianluca Bocchi (b. 1954), Italian philosopher
 Norberto Bocchi, Italian bridge player

See also
Bocchi the Rock!, manga series
Hitori Bocchi no Marumaru Seikatsu, manga series
Palazzo Bocchi, palace located in Bologna, Italy